Sergio Mario Peter (born 12 October 1986) is a German former professional footballer who played as a winger.

Early career
Born in Ludwigshafen, Rhineland-Palatinate, Peter began his career with TSV Mannheim Schönau and joined local heavyweight Waldhof Mannheim in 2003. After a successful year with Waldhof Mannheim, Peter left the club and signed a contract with Youth Academy Brockhall in July 2004.

Career
Peter came through the Youth Academy at Blackburn Rovers and joined Belgian side Cercle Brugge on loan from January 2005 until the end of the season. He only made a couple of appearances but he signed a professional contract with Blackburn on 7 July 2005.

Playing predominantly as a left-sided midfielder, Peter impressed in the Blackburn reserves, soon forcing his way into the first team. Peter made his full debut in the FA Cup third round tie with Queens Park Rangers on 7 January 2006, a game Blackburn won 3–0, with Peter setting up all three goals and named man of the match. He went on to make his league debut on 21 January 2006 as a substitute in a 1–0 win away to Newcastle United. In his final appearance for Blackburn, Peter came on as an extra time substitute as they lost in the 2007 FA Cup semi finals to Chelsea.

It was revealed by Blackburn Rovers on 2 January 2009 that Sergio was expected to sign for Sparta Prague within 24 hours. and the move was completed that very same day.

References

External links
 
 
 Sergio Peter Interview

Living people
1986 births
Sportspeople from Ludwigshafen
Association football midfielders
German footballers
Premier League players
Blackburn Rovers F.C. players
Belgian Pro League players
Cercle Brugge K.S.V. players
Czech First League players
AC Sparta Prague players
Expatriate footballers in Belgium
Expatriate footballers in England
Expatriate footballers in the Czech Republic
German expatriate sportspeople in Belgium
German expatriate sportspeople in the Czech Republic
German expatriate sportspeople in England
German expatriate footballers
Footballers from Rhineland-Palatinate